Svetlana Munkova, née Ruban (born 23 May 1965) is an Uzbekistani high jumper.

She won the silver medal at the 1993 Asian Championships and the gold medal at the 1994 Asian Games. She also competed at the 1995 World Indoor Championships, the 1995 World Championships and the 1996 Olympic Games without reaching the final.

Her personal best jump was 1.94 metres, achieved in May 1988 in Alma-Ata.

Notes

References 

1965 births
Living people
Soviet female high jumpers
Uzbekistani female high jumpers
Athletes (track and field) at the 1996 Summer Olympics
Olympic athletes of Uzbekistan
Athletes (track and field) at the 1994 Asian Games
Asian Games medalists in athletics (track and field)
Asian Games gold medalists for Uzbekistan
World Athletics Championships athletes for Uzbekistan
Medalists at the 1994 Asian Games